Get Happy may refer to:

In music:
 Get Happy (gospel music)
 "Get Happy" (song), a 1930 song written by Harold Arlen and Ted Koehler
 Get Happy! (Ella Fitzgerald album) (1959)
 Get Happy!! (Elvis Costello album) (1980)
 Get Happy (Pink Martini album) (2013)
 Get Happy with the Randy Weston Trio, a 1955 album by Randy Weston
 Get Happy! (George Shearing album), a 1991 album by George Shearing
 Get Happy, a 2007 album by Royce Campbell

In other uses:
 Get Happy (1973 film), conceived and created by Martin Charnin, starring Jack Lemmon
 Get Happy: A Coming of Age Musical Extravaganza, a 2008 documentary film by and about Mark Payne
 Get Happy: The Life of Judy Garland, a 2000 biography of Judy Garland by Gerald Clarke
 "Get Happy" (Better Off Ted), an episode of Better Off Ted